Lisa Miyoko Ginoza (born October 20, 1964) is an American lawyer from Hawaii who serves as the chief judge of the Hawaii Intermediate Court of Appeals.

Education

Ginoza received her bachelor's degree from Oregon State University, and her Juris Doctor from the William S. Richardson School of Law at the University of Hawaii.

Legal and academic career

Ginoza served as a law clerk to the Honorable Samuel P. King, Senior Judge of the United States District Court for the District of Hawaii. In 1990 she entered private practice with the law firm of McCorriston Miller Mukai MacKinnon, where she became a partner and over the course of fourteen years had an extensive civil litigation practice. From January 2005 until her appointment to the bench she served as first deputy attorney general for the State of Hawaii. Ginoza has also served as an adjunct professor in appellate advocacy at the William S. Richardson School of Law at the University of Hawaii.

Service on the Hawaii Intermediate Court of Appeals

Ginoza was first nominated to the court by Republican Governor Linda Lingle in February 2010, and her nomination was confirmed by the Hawaii Senate on March 5, 2010. Her 10-year term would have expired on May 6, 2020.

She was appointed chief judge of the court by Democratic Governor David Ige in March 2018. She was confirmed by the Hawaii Senate on April 4, 2018. She was sworn in as Chief Judge of the Intermediate Court of Appeals on April 24, 2018.

See also
List of Asian American jurists

References

External links

1964 births
Living people
20th-century American lawyers
20th-century American women lawyers
21st-century American judges
21st-century American women judges
American jurists of Asian descent
American women academics
Hawaii lawyers
Hawaii state court judges
Oregon State University alumni
People from Honolulu
William S. Richardson School of Law alumni
William S. Richardson School of Law faculty
American women legal scholars
American legal scholars